Enid Greene Mickelsen, formerly Enid Greene Waldholtz (born June 5, 1958), is an American politician from the state of Utah who served one term in the United States House of Representatives. She was the third woman and first Republican woman elected to congress from Utah. No woman was elected to Congress from Utah from her retirement in 1997 until Mia Love's election in 2014.

Early life
Greene was born in San Rafael, California, to naval officer and financier D. Forrest Greene and Gerda Marie Beyer. She is one of five children. She graduated from East High School and earned her B.A. from the University of Utah in 1980. She received her J.D. degree from Brigham Young University in 1983.

She worked as a lawyer for software company Novell and then at a Salt Lake City law firm. She was deputy chief of staff for Governor Norman H. Bangerter.

Career

Run for the U.S. House of Representatives
While serving as chair of the Young Republican National Federation (YRNF), Enid met Joe Waldholtz and they were soon in a relationship. Greene ran for the House of Representatives in 1992 against Karen Shepherd for the Utah Second District, which was entirely contained in Salt Lake County at that time, losing by four percentage points.

Second run for U.S. House of Representatives
Greene married Waldholtz in 1993. After her marriage, Greene took the name Enid Greene Waldholtz. During her 1994 rematch against Shepherd, Joe acted as her campaign manager. Her campaign spent approximately $2 million, the most expensive House race in the country that year. Greene was swept into the 104th Congress in the Republican landslide in November. She was named to the House Rules Committee, the first freshman on that committee in over 80 years, and considered to be a potential rising star in the party.

In March 1995, she announced she was pregnant. Greene became the second representative to ever give birth while in office (the first being Yvonne Brathwaite Burke) and the first Republican.

Misuse of funds
Her term was marred with scandal as her campaign was accused of campaign finance violations. Almost $1.8 million of the money spent in the 1994 campaign came from her husband, Joe, who had embezzled nearly $4 million from her father. Joe Waldholtz disappeared in November 1995 for six days before surrendering to police. During that time she announced that she was suing for divorce, for custody of her daughter, and to change her name back to 'Enid Greene'. The Washington Post reported that Waldholtz was addicted to heroin.

Under pressure from Utah Republicans, she announced on March 5, 1996, that she would not seek re-election to Congress. Joe Waldholtz pleaded guilty to federal charges of tax, bank, and campaign fraud, and then, while out on parole, was subsequently convicted of forging insurance and Veterans Affairs checks from his stepmother and his late father. He was sentenced to three to 15 years in prison.

Comeback
Greene has slowly made her way back up the state Republican ladder in Utah. In 2003, she was elected vice chair of the Utah Republican Party.

Greene was a candidate for Lieutenant Governor of Utah in 2004, but her ticket with gubernatorial candidate Nolan Karras was unsuccessful, garnering only 34% of the vote in the Republican primary.

After losing in the primary, Greene went back to being Utah GOP vice chairwoman. She became acting chair of the Utah Republican Party upon the resignation of Joe Cannon in November 2006, and was unanimously elected to serve as state party chair in February 2007 until the next convention in June 2007.

Enid Greene remarried in 2008 to then sheriff's deputy, and current judge, Scott J. Mickelsen. She was a delegate at the 2012 Republican National convention, served as chair of the 2016 Republican National Convention Site Selection Committee, and was appointed by RNC Chair Reince Priebus as chair of the 2016 Republican Convention Rules Committee.

Electoral history

 Write-in and minor candidate notes: In 1992, Eileen Koschak of the Socialist Workers party received 650 votes.

See also
 Women in the United States House of Representatives

Notes

References
 Michael Barone and Grant Ujifusa. The Almanac of American Politics, 1994. Washington, D.C.: National Journal, 1993. 
 Michael Barone and Grant Ujifusa. The Almanac of American Politics, 1998. Washington, D.C.: National Journal, 1997. 
 Michael Barone, Richard E. Cohen, and Grant Ujifusa. The Almanac of American Politics, 2002. Washington, D.C.: National Journal, 2001. 
 Benson, Lee. Blind Trust: The True Story of Enid Greene & Joe Waldholtz, Agreka Books (November 1997), 
 Leigh Dethman, "Greene elected Utah GOP chief", Deseret News, February 11, 2007

External links

 

1958 births
Latter Day Saints from California
Living people
J. Reuben Clark Law School alumni
University of Utah alumni
Utah lawyers
Female members of the United States House of Representatives
Women in Utah politics
People from San Rafael, California
American women lawyers
Republican Party members of the United States House of Representatives from Utah
Republican National Committee members
Utah politicians convicted of crimes
20th-century American women politicians
20th-century American politicians
Latter Day Saints from Utah